Zdrojki may refer to the following places in Poland:
Zdrojki, Greater Poland Voivodeship (west-central Poland)
Zdrojki, Podlaskie Voivodeship (north-east Poland)
Zdrójki, Człuchów County, Pomeranian Voivodeship (north Poland)
Zdrójki, Starogard County, Pomeranian Voivodeship (north Poland)